Sir John Jaffray, 1st Baronet (11 October 1818 – 4 January 1901) was a Scottish journalist and newspaper proprietor.

Born in Stirling, he moved to Birmingham in 1844, to work for John Frederick Feeney on the Birmingham Journal, and became a partner in it in 1852. Together they founded the Birmingham Daily Post, (now Birmingham Post) in 1857. He founded the Birmingham Mail with Feeney's son John Feeney in 1870.

He was president of Birmingham General Hospital and founded Birmingham's Jaffray Hospital.

In an 1873 by-election, he stood for the parliamentary seat for East Staffordshire, as a Liberal, but was defeated by 2,893 votes to 3.630 by the Conservative candidate, Samuel Allsopp.

He served as High Sheriff of Warwickshire in 1888 and was created a Baronet, of Skilts in Studley in the County of Warwick, in 1892, taking his title from the estate he had bought there.

References 

 Kidd, Charles, Williamson, David (editors). Debrett's Peerage and Baronetage (1990 edition). New York: St Martin's Press, 1990.
 
 Birmingham City Archives, MS 1784, introduction (from  - search for John Jaffray).
 "Parishes: Studley", A History of the County of Warwick: Volume 3: Barlichway hundred (1945), pp. 175–187. Jaffray (accessed: 30 January 2008).

1818 births
1901 deaths
Baronets in the Baronetage of the United Kingdom
19th-century British newspaper publishers (people)
19th-century British newspaper founders
High Sheriffs of Warwickshire
Sheriffs of Warwickshire
Scottish journalists
Liberal Party (UK) parliamentary candidates